The 2019 Athletissima was the 43rd edition of the annual outdoor track and field meeting in Lausanne, Switzerland. Held from 4–5 July primarily at the Stade Olympique de la Pontaise, it was the eighth leg of the 2019 IAAF Diamond League – the highest level international track and field circuit. The women's pole vault (the City Event) was held on 4 July at the esplanade of the Le Flon district, with the other events following the next day at the Stade Olympique. 28 events total were contested with 14 of them being point-scoring Diamond League disciplines.

The last race of the meet staged the eighth fastest men's 200 m performance in history by Noah Lyles, who broke Usain Bolt's meeting record with world-leading time of 19.50 seconds. That made him the fourth fastest man over 200 m in history, and the second fastest American ever after former world record holder Michael Johnson. Meeting records and world leads were also set in the men's 1500 m and pole vault events by Timothy Cheruiyot (3:28.77) and Piotr Lisek (6.01 m) respectively, the latter also a Polish record. Hagos Gebrhiwet notably finished and celebrated one lap early in the men's 5000 m, causing him to fall back to tenth place once he realized his mistake and to cede the race to Ethiopian teammate Yomif Kejelcha.

On the women's side, Shelly-Ann Fraser-Pryce finished the Diamond League 100 m with a time of 10.74 seconds, winning by a 0.17-second margin ahead of last year's joint-fastest women Dina Asher-Smith and Marie-Josée Ta Lou. It was Fraser-Pryce's 13th race under 10.80 seconds in her career and tied Marion Jones' record for the most races under the same time. In the Diamond League 400 m, Salwa Eid Naser almost handed Aminatou Seyni a win while relaxing in the home straight, but Naser was able to narrowly hold off Seyni (49.17 to 49.19) after Naser realized her mistake. Naser's time broke Marie-José Pérec's 23-year-old meeting record of 49.45 seconds, and Seyni's new Nigerien record was the second fastest ever run by an African woman.

Diamond League results
Athletes competing in the Diamond League disciplines earned extra compensation and points which went towards qualifying for one of two Diamond League finals (either Zürich or Brussels depending on the discipline). First place earned 8 points, with each step down in place earning one less point than the previous, until no points are awarded in 9th place or lower.

Men

Women

Non-Diamond League results

Men

Women

Swiss under-18

Swiss under-14

See also
2019 Weltklasse Zürich (first half of the Diamond League final)
2019 Memorial Van Damme (second half of the Diamond League final)

References

Results
Results ATHLETISSIMA LAUSANNE. IAAF Diamond League (2019-07-05). Retrieved 2020-03-31.

External links
Official Diamond League Athletissima website

Athletissima
Athletissima
Athletissima